Malinovka is a rural locality (a selo) in Novoobintsevsky Selsoviet, Shelabolikhinsky District, Altai Krai, Russia. The population was 25 as of 2013. There is 1 street.

Geography 
Malinovka is located 14 km east of Shelabolikha (the district's administrative centre) by road. Novoobintsevo is the nearest rural locality.

References 

Rural localities in Shelabolikhinsky District